Paul Guzman, better known as Pablo Guzmán, is a reporter for WCBS-TV in New York City. He joined CBS 2 News in 1995 and is currently a senior correspondent for the station.  Before WCBS-TV, he was a reporter for Metromedia Channel 5 WNEW-TV (Now FOX 5 WNYW-TV) from 1984–1992 and at WNBC-TV from 1992–1995. He won two regional Emmy Awards.

Career
Guzmán graduated from the Bronx High School of Science (class  of 1968) and attended the State University of New York at Old Westbury. He was also one of the founders of the Young Lords party.

Guzman later became a journalist writing for publications such as the Village Voice, Essence, Rolling Stone, Musician, Downbeat, Billboard, and the New York Daily News.

Guzmán was also featured in the 1992 film, Juice.

On May 5, 2008, Pablo was involved in a single-car wreck that left him with two broken ribs. On July 22, 2008 he suffered a heart attack while at home. He underwent an angioplasty and has since made a complete recovery.

In 2013 he suffered from severe blood clotting in his legs that prevented him from being on air.

Guzmán is of Puerto Rican and Cuban descent.

References

American television journalists
Television personalities from New York City
American people of Cuban descent
American journalists of Puerto Rican descent
New York (state) television reporters
Year of birth missing (living people)
Living people
State University of New York at Old Westbury alumni
American male journalists
Young Lords
The Bronx High School of Science alumni